Zhujiajiao is a Shanghai Metro station in Shanghai's Qingpu District. Located at the intersection of Zhufeng Highway and Huqingping Highway, the station is named after the nearby Zhujiajiao town, an ancient canal town and major tourist attraction in Shanghai. It opened with the rest of Line 17 on 30 December 2017.

History 
The station opened for passenger trial operations on 30 December 2017, concurrent with the opening of the rest of Line 17.

Description 
The station is located at the southwest corner of Zhufeng Highway and Huqingping Highway, in the Qingpu District of Shanghai. An elevated structure, the concourse level is connected by three entrances, two of which descend to street level on the south side of Huqingping Highway, and another which connects to the north side of the roadway via a pedestrian footbridge. Above the concourse level is the platform level, which consists of a single island platform. Toilets are located at the west end of the platform, within the fare-paid zone.

Like all stations on Line 17, Zhujiajiao station is fully accessible. The station is served by three elevators. Two elevators connect the street level to the concourse, from both the north and south sides of the street, near Exits 1 and 2 respectively. A third elevator connects the concourse to the platform within the fare-paid zone.

Exits 
The station has three operational exits:
 Exit 1: Huqingping Highway north side, Zhufeng Highway (over footbridge)
 Exit 2: Huqingping Highway south side, Zhufeng Highway
 Exit 5: Huqingping Highway

Metro infrastructure in the vicinity 
To the west of the station is the Zhujiajiao rail yard, which serves as a storage yard for trains on Line 17.

Nearby landmarks 

The station is named after Zhujiajiao, an ancient town famous for its canals and a popular tourist destination.

References 

Railway stations in Shanghai
Railway stations in China opened in 2017
Shanghai Metro stations in Qingpu District
Line 17, Shanghai Metro